Pubudu Hasanka (born 14 August 1991) is a Sri Lankan cricketer. He made his Twenty20 debut for Panadura Sports Club in the 2017–18 SLC Twenty20 Tournament on 24 February 2018. He made his List A debut for Panadura Sports Club in the 2017–18 Premier Limited Overs Tournament on 10 March 2018.

References

External links
 

1991 births
Living people
Sri Lankan cricketers
Panadura Sports Club cricketers
Place of birth missing (living people)